Federico Castellón ( – ) was a Spanish American painter, sculptor, printmaker and illustrator of children's books.

Biography
Castellón was born on Alhabia, Almeria, Spain, studied in Madrid and Paris and settled in Brooklyn, New York.

Federico Cristencia de Castellón y Martínez, better known as Federico Castellón, was a surrealist printmaker, illustrator, painter, and sculptor. He was born in Almeria, Spain in 1914. With his family, he immigrated in 1921 to the United States. They resided in Brooklyn, New York.

A fundamentally self-taught artist, Castellón began sketching at an early age. He took advantage of his family's relocation and visited the museums of New York. Consequently, his influences ranged from Old Masters to the modern artists of his day, including Giorgio de Chirico, Pablo Picasso, Salvador Dalí, and Georges Rouault.

Castellón attended Erasmus High School, where his teachers recognized his draughtsmanship. After graduation, he completed a mural for the school based on the subject of arts and sciences. The mural was informed by Castellón's interest in the modern European movements, and it attracted critical attention when exhibited at Raymond & Raymond Galleries in New York before it was installed permanently in the school.

About this time, Castellón was introduced to Diego Rivera, who had an international reputation and was painting murals for Rockefeller Center. The older artist took an interest in the young man's work and brought Castellón's drawings to the attention of the director of the Weyhe Gallery in New York, who subsequently gave the eighteen-year-old Castellón his first solo exhibition.

In 1934, with Rivera's help, Castellón was awarded a four-year fellowship, sponsored by the Spanish Government, to travel throughout Europe to study painting and printmaking. During this same period, Castellón began to exhibit his work in museums in France and Spain.

In 1935, Castellón participated in the Paris Exhibition of Spanish Artists that included Pablo Picasso, Juan Gris, and Joan Miró.

In 1937, Castellón returned to New York and began experimenting with the medium of lithography, using this medium to create illustrations for Edgar Allan Poe's allegorical tale, "The Masque of Red Death". Over the years, Castellón's work as an illustrator would eventually include Bulfinch's Mythology, The Story of Marco Polo, and The Little Prince.

In 1940, Castellón received the first of two Guggenheim fellowships. His work continued to attract attention as he was included in exhibitions at the Museum of Modern Art, the Whitney Museum of American Art, and the Art Institute of Chicago.

Castellón became an American citizen in 1943. During WWII, he was with the OSS and assigned to the Burma theater. Throughout the 1940s and 1950s, his work was informed by his travels abroad: to China with the U.S. Army; to Italy on his second Guggenheim fellowship; and to Paris and Madrid, where he moved his family for a brief period during which he undertook commissions from American periodicals, including The Epic of Man series for LIFE magazine.

In 1949, he was commissioned by the Print Club of Albany for its annual print.

Although his formal education ended with high school, Castellón taught at Teachers College, Columbia University, Pratt Institute, and Queens College. He was elected to membership in the National Academy of Design in New York, was awarded a First Prize from the Library of Congress, and he was a member of the Society of American Graphic Artists.

Castellón died in 1971. A retrospective of his prints was held at the Allied Artists of America in 1978. In 1982, a retrospective exhibition of his work was held at Anderson & Anderson Master Prints (Loveland, Colorado). In 2004, his prints and paintings were exhibited at Emil Nelson Gallery (Denver, Colorado). In early 2010, Castellón's work was exhibited at the Kalamazoo Institute, along with the graphic work of Francisco Goya.

Although Castellón worked in virtually every media, he remains best known for his early graphic work, particularly his lithographs and etchings, media in which he became a master. His prints and drawings of the early 1930s are the first examples of Surrealism created by an American; a considerable feat because Castellón produced these highly original works not only before his travels abroad, but before the seminal exhibition "Fantastic Art, Dada, Surrealism" at New York's Museum of Modern Art.

References
 
 
 
 
 

1914 births
1971 deaths
20th-century American painters
American male painters
20th-century Spanish painters
20th-century American male artists
Spanish male painters
American illustrators
People from Almería
Spanish emigrants to the United States
American surrealist artists
Spanish surrealist artists
Teachers College, Columbia University faculty